Methyl methanesulfonate (MMS), also known as methyl mesylate, is an alkylating agent and a carcinogen. It is also a suspected reproductive toxicant, and may also be a skin/sense organ toxicant. It is used in cancer treatment.

Chemical reactions with DNA
MMS methylates DNA predominantly on N7-deoxyguanosine and N3-deoxyadenosine, and to a much lesser extent also methylates at other oxygen and nitrogen atoms in DNA bases, and also methylates one of the non-carbon bound oxygen atoms of the phosphodiester linkage. Originally, this action was believed to directly cause double-stranded DNA breaks, because homologous recombination-deficient cells are particularly vulnerable to the effects of MMS. However, it is now believed that MMS stalls replication forks, and cells that are homologous recombination-deficient have difficulty repairing the damaged replication forks.

See also

 Dimethyl sulfite, a chemical with the same molecular formula but different arrangement

References

Methyl esters
Methylating agents
Mesylate esters
Reagents for organic chemistry
IARC Group 2A carcinogens